Acanthothecis saxicola is a species of saxicolous (rock-dwelling) lichen in the family Graphidaceae. Found in Brazil, it was formally described as a new species in 2022 by André Aptroot, Robert Lücking, and Marcela Eugenia da Silva M.Cáceres. The lichen has an ochraceous white thallus lacking a cortex and a prothallus. Its asci contains eight spores, and the ascospores are hyaline, measuring 22–30 by 5 μm with 6 to 8 transverse septa. Acanthothecis saxicola contains stictic acid, a lichen product detectable using thin-layer chromatography.

References

saxicola
Lichen species
Lichens described in 2022
Lichens of Northeast Brazil
Taxa named by André Aptroot
Taxa named by Robert Lücking
Taxa named by Marcela Cáceres